The  is a river located in central Miyagi prefecture, in the Tōhoku region of northern Japan. It starts at Mount Kamuro in the Ōu Mountains and flows in an easterly direction through the cities of Natori and Sendai. The river's headwaters start in the Zao Mountain range, it flows through the Sendai Plain and ends by draining into Sendai Bay. The river's estuary is located on Japan's east coast, and faces the Pacific Ocean. The river's flow is the greatest during the snow melt season from March to April, the rainy season from June to July and during the typhoon season from September to October. The river's length is 55 km, and its tributaries are the Hirose, Masuda and Goishi Rivers. The Natori provides water for 1 million people in the city of Sendai.

Basin
The river's basin is 939 km2 and has two primary reservoirs, the Okura dam reservoir and the Kamafusa Dam reservoir, both of which serve as regulators of flood control and for the supply of water. In the event of the river flooding, the dams serve to control and reduce water flow to lower basins.

Futakuchi Ravine 
The ravine contains the Akiu Great Falls, one of "Japan’s Top 100 Waterfalls", in a listing published by the Japanese Ministry of the Environment in 1990 and a nationally designated Place of Scenic Beauty.

This cliff is also a nationally designated Place of Scenic Beauty.

The northern part of the ravine is within the borders of the Zao Quasi-National Park, and the middle and southern portions are part of a Prefectural park. At the southern end of the ravine is the Akiho Onsen, a hot spring resort area.

References

Further reading
 Radioactive Waste Management Stability and Buffering Capacity of the ... - OECD, Nuclear Energy Agency - Google Books
 Japan to evacuate residents near nuke plant | Amarillo Globe-News

Rivers of Miyagi Prefecture
Natori, Miyagi
Sendai
Rivers of Japan
Landforms of Miyagi Prefecture
Places of Scenic Beauty
Canyons and gorges of Japan
Tourist attractions in Miyagi Prefecture